Gorō Yamaguchi (山口 五郎; February 26, 1933 – January 3, 1999) was a Japanese shakuhachi player who worked in both solo and ensemble performances. He was noted for his influential recordings of Traditional Japanese music and one of his pieces was selected by NASA to be included on the Voyager Golden Record and launched into space.

Career
Yamaguchi headed the Chikumeisha shakuhachi guild and became a world-famous Japanese performer and teacher. In 1967–1968 he was appointed Artist in Residence at Wesleyan University in Middletown, Connecticut, United States, along with Yamada-school koto performers Namino Torii and his wife, Yamaguchi Hozomi.

While at Wesleyan, Yamaguchi recorded his LP, A Bell Ringing In The Empty Sky, which was released Nonesuch on its Explorer Series.

This was an influential first recording of shakuhachi in the United States, and in 1977 NASA selected a honkyoku from the LP, "Tsuru No Sugomori" ("Depicting the Cranes in their Nest"), to be included on the Voyager Golden Record, a gold-plated copper record that was sent into space on the Voyager space craft. The record contained sounds and images which had been chosen as examples of the diversity of life and culture on Earth.

In 1992, the Japanese government designated Yamaguchi a Living National Treasure (Ningen Kokuhô).

Major recordings 
 A Bell Ringing In The Empty Sky Nonesuch  Explorer Series  H-72025
 Shakuhachi no Shinzui: Shakuhachi Honkyoku (Soul of Shakuhachi: Shakuhachi Honkyoku).  Solo performance of complete Kinko school honkyoku repertoire: 38 compositions on 12 CDs.  Boxed set with 44-page booklet.  Japan Victor VZCG-8066-8077.
 Shakuhachi no Shinzui: Sankyoku Gassô (Soul of Shakuhachi: Trio Ensemble).  Ensemble performances with voice, koto, and shamisen.  Four CDs in boxed set with 44-page booklet.  Japan Victor VZCG-8078-81.

Audio link
 Brief excerpt from "Nesting of Cranes" perf. by Yamaguchi

Obits 
 Appreciation by Christopher Yohmei Blasdel
 Appreciation by Monty Levenson

References

1933 births
1999 deaths
Shakuhachi players
Wesleyan University faculty
Living National Treasures of Japan
20th-century Japanese musicians
20th-century flautists